is a railway station in the city of Ōgaki, Gifu Prefecture Japan, operated by the private railway operator Yōrō Railway.

Lines

Station layout
Tomoe Station has a single ground-level side platform and a single ground-level island platform connected by a level crossing; however, one side of the island platform is not in use. The station is unattended.

Platforms

Adjacent stations

|-
!colspan=5|Yōrō Railway

History
Tomoe Station opened on July 31, 1913.

Passenger statistics
In fiscal 2015, the station was used by an average of 403 passengers daily (boarding passengers only).

Surrounding area
  Tomoe Post Office

See also
 List of Railway Stations in Japan

References

External links

 

Railway stations in Gifu Prefecture
Railway stations in Japan opened in 1913
Stations of Yōrō Railway
Ōgaki